The North Korea national under-20 football team is the youth association football team representing North Korea in youth competitions and it is controlled by DPR Korea Football Association. The team participated in 2014 AFC U-19 Championship and qualified for the 2015 FIFA U-20 World Cup after reaching the Finals stage.

Participation in Tournaments

FIFA U-20 World Cup

AFC U-19 Championship

Current squad 
The following 21 players were called up to the squad for 2018 AFC U-19 Championship

See also

 North Korea national football team 
 North Korea national under-23 football team
 North Korea women's national football team

References

u20
Asian national under-20 association football teams